Sarim Momin  (born 10 December 1978 in Mumbai, India), is a filmmaker, writer, and lyricist for many Bollywood movies. His written work includes Ram Gopal Varma's Sarkar, Rann, Sholay (Aag), Darling, EMI, Go, Shabri & D, Bhagam Bhaag, Hide and Seek, The Film, Agyaat, and Rann.

His unreleased feature film ARZI won the awards for Best Picture, Best Actor and Best Actress at Hollywood International Moving Pictures Film Festival in Los Angeles.

His upcoming films as a Writer-Director include KHABEES which has been announced.
and HAWA SINGH starring Sooraj Pancholi 

His last lyrical work released with Lucky Ali on his new album Raasta-Man.

Sarim Momin was nominated as the "Best Lyricist" for the Indian Television Academy Awards, 2012.

He turned a filmmaker (Writer & Director) with his debut feature film ARZI which won three Awards in the Hollywood International Moving Pictures Film Festival, Los Angeles including 'Best Picture', 'Best Actress', and 'Best Actor'.

Personal life
Gauri Karnik has been married to Sarim Momin since 2010 and lives in Mumbai.

References 

Indian male songwriters
Urdu-language poets from India
Muslim writers
1978 births
Living people
Urdu-language lyricists